Ruslan Mostovyi (2 June 1974 – 26 November 2021) was a Ukrainian professional football coach and player. 

He was killed in a traffic accident in Stryi Raion.

References

External links
 
 

1974 births
2021 deaths
Sportspeople from Lviv
Ukrainian footballers
Association football defenders
FC Skala Stryi (1911) players
FC Avanhard Zhydachiv players
FC Lviv (1992) players
FC Spartak Ivano-Frankivsk players
FC Krystal Chortkiv players
FC Khutrovyk Tysmenytsia players
FC Podillya Khmelnytskyi players
FC Tekhno-Centre Rohatyn players
PFC Spartak Nalchik players
FC Tom Tomsk players
FC Prykarpattia Ivano-Frankivsk (2004) players
FC Volyn Lutsk players
FC Hoverla Uzhhorod players
FC Enerhetyk Burshtyn players
FC Lviv players
FC Rukh Lviv players
Ukrainian Premier League players
Ukrainian First League players
Russian Premier League players
Ukrainian expatriate footballers
Expatriate footballers in Russia
Ukrainian football managers
FC Rukh Lviv managers
FC Prykarpattia Ivano-Frankivsk (1998) managers
Road incident deaths in Ukraine